It Was I! (Italian: Sono stato io!) is a 1937 Italian comedy film directed by Raffaello Matarazzo and starring Eduardo De Filippo, Peppino De Filippo and Titina De Filippo. The film was based on a play, Sarà stato Giovannino by Paola Riccora.

It was shot at the Tirrenia Studios. The film's sets were designed by the art director Virgilio Marchi.

Cast
 Eduardo De Filippo as Giovannino Apicella  
 Peppino De Filippo as Carlino  
 Titina De Filippo as Donna Rosa  
 Isa Pola as Lisa  
 Alida Valli as Lauretta  
 Federico Collino as Matteo 
 Lina Gennari as Fiammetta 
 Tecla Scarano as Fiammetta's mother
 Silvio Bagolini 
 Calisto Bertramo 
 Corrado De Cenzo
 Silvana Jachino 
 Armando Migliari
 Dina Perbellini    
 Albino Principe   
 Mirella Scriatto    
 Guglielmo Sinaz
 Vinicio Sofia    
 Marisa Vernati

References

Bibliography 
 Moliterno, Gino. Historical Dictionary of Italian Cinema. Scarecrow Press, 2008.

External links 

1937 films
Italian comedy films
1937 comedy films
1930s Italian-language films
Films directed by Raffaello Matarazzo
Italian black-and-white films
Films shot at Tirrenia Studios
1930s Italian films